"Elevator Love" is the second single released from Guy Sebastian's third studio album, Closer to the Sun. The single also contained two non-album B-sides, "Never Said Goodbye" and "Wish I Didn't Tell You", as well as an instrumental version of "Elevator Love". It reached No. 11 on the ARIA singles chart, spending 15 weeks in the top 50, and achieved gold accreditation.

Music video
The music video for "Elevator Love" premiered on 8 November 2006 on the Nine Network. The video for the single features model and former Miss Universe Jennifer Hawkins as Sebastian's love interest. Footage of Sebastian and a backing band playing in a cage-style elevator is interspersed with shots of the couple. At the end of the video, Sebastian and Hawkins appear to kiss as the doors of the elevator close. The clip was filmed in Sydney's Queen Victoria Building. The video was directed by Owen Trevor, through Ticket to Ride, a Sydney production company.

Track listing

Charts

Certifications

References

2006 singles
Guy Sebastian songs
Songs written by Guy Sebastian
2006 songs
Songs written by Jarrad Rogers
Sony BMG singles